Cedric Hubbell Whitman (December 1, 1916 – June 5, 1979) was an American poet and academician from Providence, Rhode Island. He received his PhD from Harvard University in 1947 and joined the faculty that year. In 1966, he became the first Jones Professor of Classic Literature. In 1974, Whitman became the Eliot Professor of Greek Literature, a position he would serve until his death in 1979.

Whitman is known for his research into Greek playwrights, Sophocles and Homer, and wrote Sophocles: A Study in Heroic Humanism in 1951 which won him the Award of Merit of the American Philological Association the following year. His 1958 book, Homer and the Heroic Tradition, won him the Christian Gauss Prize.

References

1916 births
1979 deaths
Harvard University alumni
People from Providence, Rhode Island
American male poets
20th-century American male writers